Pebe Sebert is an American singer, songwriter, and multi instrumentalist who is known for writing the number one single "Old Flames Can't Hold a Candle to You" by Dolly Parton and also writing many songs with her daughter Kesha. Sebert has also written songs for Miranda Cosgrove, Miley Cyrus, Pitbull, School Gyrls, Riders in the Sky, and Joe Sun.

Songs

References

Sebert, Pebe